Moustafa Palazli Chousein-Oglou (born 28 December 1990 in Xanthi, Greece), sometimes known as Moustafa Palazli is a Greek-born British actor of Turkish origin. He is best known for playing Blane in the BBC children's comedy adventure M.I. High.

Early life
Moustafa was born in Xanthi, in northern Greece, into a family from the Turkish minority of Western Thrace. He studied at Pimlico Secondary School, Sir John Cass Redcoat School and Kingston College.

After appearing on M.I. High, Moustafa had a guest appearance in the medical drama, Casualty. He has also appeared in Basil's Swap Shop as the Tea Boy.

Selected filmography

Television

Film

References

External links

1990 births
Living people
British male television actors
British people of Turkish descent
Greek emigrants to the United Kingdom
Alumni of Kingston College (England)
People educated at Pimlico Academy